StreetArt: The Punk Poster in San Francisco 1977–1981 by Peter Belsito,  Bob Davis  and Marian Kester, and published by Last Gasp, was the first published effort to attempt to document the punk rock poster in the U.S.

The book was inspired by an exhibition of punk rock posters curated by Peter Belsito, Susan Pedrick and Bob Davis at Valencia Tool & Die mounted during the Western Front Punk Festival held in San Francisco in October 1980. The artwork was found on the streets of San Francisco, put there with the intent to advertise local music events or political viewpoints.

StreetArt grew out of an exhibition of the same name presented at Valencia Tool & Die in conjunction with the Western Front Festival. The book reproduces 126 black and white, Xerox and off-set posters, almost all of them advertising bands. The posters are augmented by Marian Kester's witty and offhanded text, which is in turn augmented by snippets of published interviews, articles on subjects like performance art and even excerpts from Walter Benjamin's mid-century essay, "Art in the Age of Mechanical Reproduction." Brad Lapin's introductory "15 Theses" provides effective theoretical counterpoint to Kester's more narrative/anecdotal brand of cultural history, by placing the mass-produced punk poster within the context of McLuhan, industrial society and youthful rebellion.

"These disparate elements ad up to much more than an art book devoted to advertising imagery. StreetArt is a sociological document chronicling a vital phenomenon, one which has—at the very least—profoundly influenced painting, graphic design and fashion. (It may still be a bit early to assess the covert cultural impact of punk.) Lest I mislead, StreetArt is also an engaging art book, surveying a graphically oriented style heavy on collage and future shock or nostalgia schlock imagery."

References

External links 
 http://printfetish.com/pf-collection/

Punk mass media
Posters
Books about visual art
Last Gasp titles
Culture of San Francisco
Books about the San Francisco Bay Area
Music of the San Francisco Bay Area
1981 non-fiction books
1970s in San Francisco
1980s in San Francisco